Sonja Alhäuser (born 1969) is a German artist.

Biography 

Sonja Alhäuser was born in Kirchen (Westerwald), Germany in 1969 and studied at the Staatliche Kunstakademie (State Art Academy) in Düsseldorf, becoming "Meisterschülerin" (Master Disciple) of Fritz Schwegler in 1995. 

From 2002 to 2005, Alhäuser taught drawing at the University of Duisburg-Essen, and from 2007 to 2009 painting at the Braunschweig Academy. 
She has received a large number of awards, including the “Peter-Mertes-Scholarship” of the “Bonn Kunstverein” in 1997, the “Förderpreis der Stadt Düsseldorf” in 2000 and the “Dorothea Erxleben-Scholarship” of the Federal State of Lower Saxony, 2007–2009. 
She now lives and works in Berlin and is represented by Michael Schultz Gallery.

Works 
Alhäuser's work in different media is, for a large part, characterized by the fascination of the transitory, both in materials used and in the nature of her performances and installations. She has made banquet installations of edible materials and also shaped sculptures out of butter, chocolate and other foods.
The ephemeral character of the installations does not only point at the transitoriness of life but also sets her work in the context of venerable traditions: for instance Joseph Beuys who likewise employed transitory materials (like fat and honey) whilst the banquet as an artistic subject reaches from Petronius Arbiter's Cena Trimalchionis to paintings of kings' banquets (where one felt honoured to be invited to watch the nobility feasting) and finally the Last Supper.
She also casts sculptures in German Silver and makes large wall drawings. Furthermore, she works in traditional media like watercolours, acrylic and crayon by means of which she is creating distributive, all-over-like compositions of animals, fruits, vegetables, clothing, body parts, and mythological figures. Thus her oeuvre is considered a contribution to the discourse on environmental ethics.

Publications 
 Sonja Alhäuser, Kunst in Schokolade, Gesellschaft für moderne Kunst am Museum Ludwig, Imhoff-Stollwerck-Museum (edd.), Cologne 2005
 Sonja Alhäuser, Immerzu, Cologne 2007
 Sonja Alhäuser, Hartgesotten, Städtische Galerie Delmenhorst / Kunstverein Ulm 2010
 Sonja Alhäuser, fundamentales Vielleicht, Galerie Michael Schultz, Berlin 2010
 Sonja Alhäuser, Maximelange, Galerie Michael Schultz, Berlin 2013

References

External links 
 

1969 births
Living people
20th-century German women artists
21st-century German women artists
German contemporary artists
German performance artists
German installation artists
German sculptors
Kunstakademie Düsseldorf alumni
People from Kirchen
Women performance artists